was a Japanese actress active from 1949 to 1980.

She joined the Nichigeki Dancing Team in 1946. In 1949, she was discovered by film director Keisuke Kinoshita and gave her film debut in his comedy Broken Drum. Under contract with the Shochiku film studios, she starred in many films of Kinoshita and Masaki Kobayashi.

She was married to new wave film director Hiroshi Teshigahara from 1956 until his death in 2001, with whom she had two daughters.

Selected filmography
 1949: Broken Drum (破れ太鼓 Yabure-daiko) – dir. Keisuke Kinoshita
 1951: Carmen Comes Home (カルメン故郷に帰る Karumen kokyō ni kaeru) – dir. Keisuke Kinoshita
 1951: Boyhood (少年期 Shōnenki) – dir. Keisuke Kinoshita 
 1951: Fireworks over the Sea (海の花火 Umi no hanabi) – dir. Keisuke Kinoshita 
 1952: Carmen's Pure Love (カルメン純情す Karumen junjōsu) – dir. Keisuke Kinoshita 
 1955: Twenty-Four Eyes (二十四の瞳 Nijushi no hitomi) – dir. Keisuke Kinoshita
 1954: Somewhere Under the Broad Sky (女性に関する十二章 Kono hiroi sora no dokoka ni) – dir. Masaki Kobayashi
 1955: She Was Like a Wild Chrysanthemum (野菊の如き君なりき Nogiku no gotoki kimi nariki) – dir. Keisuke Kinoshita
 1955: Beautiful Days (美わしき歳月 Uruwashiki saigetsu) – dir. Masaki Kobayashi
 1955: The Tattered Wings (遠い雲 Tōi kumo) – dir. Keisuke Kinoshita
 1956: The Thick-Walled Room (壁あつき部屋 Kabe atsuki heya) – dir. Masaki Kobayashi
 1957: The Story of Pure Love (純愛物語 Jun'ai monogatari) – dir. Tadashi Imai
 1957: Danger Stalks Near (風前の灯 Fūzen no tomoshibi) – dir. Keisuke Kinoshita
 1959: The Human Condition Pt. 1 + 2 (人間の條件 Ningen no jōken) – dir. Masaki Kobayashi
 1960: Cruel Story of Youth (青春残酷物語 Seishun Zankoku Monogatari) – dir. Nagisa Ōshima
 1968: Black Lizard (黒蜥蜴 Kurotokage) – dir. Kinji Fukasaku
 1972: Summer Soldiers (サマー・ソルジャー Samā sorujā) – dir. Hiroshi Teshigahara
 1980: Woman (ザ・ウーマン Za ūman) – dir. Yoichi Takabayashi

References

External links

1932 births
2016 deaths
20th-century Japanese actresses
Japanese film actresses
People from Tokyo